The Torped 47 or SLWT (Saab’s Lightweight Torpedo) is a new lightweight torpedo intended for ASW and surface targets, providing multiple-target active/passive homing combined with wire guidance. It is designed and manufactured by Saab Dynamics as a replacement for the Torped 45.

The torpedo is designed for the Swedish Navy and it will be equipped with both a passive and an active homing device and use wire communication like the Torpedo 45, using a galvanic wire (later also an optical wire).

Torpedo 47 can be launched from a variety of platforms including stationary, surface vessels, submarines, helicopters and airplanes like Saab Swordfish MPA. It is specifically designed to operate against littoral submarine targets and surface vessels. It is controlled using wire guidance and has a hydro-acoustic homing system for the final phase. The torpedo has features that are unique for lightweight torpedoes.

SLWT will be delivered to the Finnish Navy as part of the Squadron 2020 program and will be installed on the Hamina-class during MLU and the new Pohjanmaa-class corvette.

In October 2022 Saab delivered the first Torped 47 to the Swedish FMV. This is the final step before it will be introduced in the Swedish Navy.

Future operators

References

Torpedoes of Sweden